Lukinsky is a rural locality (a village) in Krasnozilimsky Selsoviet, Arkhangelsky District, Bashkortostan, Russia. The population was 14 as of 2010. There are 2 streets.

Geography 
Lukinsky is located 17 km southwest of Arkhangelskoye (the district's administrative centre) by road. Akkulevo is the nearest rural locality.

References 

Rural localities in Arkhangelsky District